Roy Charles Amara (7 April 1925 – 31 December 2007) was an American researcher, scientist, futurist and president of the Institute for the Future best known for coining Amara's law on the effect of technology. He held a BS in Management, an MS in the Arts and Sciences, and a PhD in Systems Engineering, and also worked at the Stanford Research Institute.

Amara's law 
His adage about forecasting the effects of technology has become known as Amara's law and states:

We tend to overestimate the effect of a technology in the short run and underestimate the effect in the long run.

The law has been used in explaining nanotechnology.

Selected bibliography

Books

Reports 
 
 
 
 
 
 
 
 
 
  Published in Conference proceedings 1978 Winter Simulation Conference (WSC 1978). Pdf.

References

1925 births
2007 deaths
Futurologists
American scientists